Johann Michael Röder was a German organ builder in Berlin and Silesia from the first half of the 18th century. He was a pupil of Arp Schnitger.

Life 
Röder's year of birth and death are unknown. He was apprenticed to Schnitger for four years as a journeyman carpenter. In 1712, Vincent Lübeck described him in a letter to the Tangermünde council as a "big talker" who "greatly despises and contempts Herr Schnitger". In Röder's works, the influence of his teacher can be clearly heard, but he went his own way in the external design of the organs and moved further away from Schnitger than any of his students. His special technical skills earned him the name "Mechanicus" and led to all kinds of late Baroque such as kettledrum-beating angels, eagles, stars of orders, suns and others.

Johann Mattheson commented positively on Röder's organ in Breslau: "All emperors, kings and princes would be astonished if they saw the engraving of it and it consists of 56 sounding parts: 4 principals, as one a 32, one a 16 and two a 8 feet, a glockenspiel, which is tracted by the angels moving in the Gloria with their hammers in their hands with the help of the pedal as well as a pair of küpferner (visible) timpani, on which likewise two angels perfectly present everything that can be had on natural timpani with their mallets and can be played with the trumpet as well as intros and lifts.

List of works (selection) 
Some are partially preserved.

New organ buildings

Further work and offers

References

Further reading 
 
 
 Gustav Fock: '"Röder, Johann Michael". In Friedrich Blume (ed.): Die Musik in Geschichte und Gegenwart (MGG). First edition, volume 11 (Rasch – Schnyder von Wartensee). Bärenreiter/Metzler, Kassel among others 1963, Sp. 606–608
 
 Uwe Pape: Röder, Johann Michael. In Ludwig Finscher (ed.): Die Musik in Geschichte und Gegenwart. Second edition, personal part, volume 14 (Riccati – Schönstein). Bärenreiter/Metzler, Kassel among others 2005,  (Online-Edition, subscription required for full access)

External links 
 
 Joh. Michael Martin Röder Orgellandschaft Brandenburg

German pipe organ builders
Date of birth missing
Date of death missing
Place of birth missing